Slovenia has submitted films for the Academy Award for Best International Feature Film since 1993, but has not yet won an award. Slovenia's 2008 submission, Rooster's Breakfast, became the highest-grossing Slovenian film of all time. Before 1993, Slovenia was a republic within Yugoslavia. In 1961, a film shot in Serbo-Croatian and representing Yugoslavia (The Ninth Circle) became the first and only film directed by a Slovenian to be nominated for an Oscar.

Submissions
The Academy of Motion Picture Arts and Sciences has invited the film industries of various countries to submit their best film for the Academy Award for Best Foreign Language Film since 1956. The Foreign Language Film Award Committee oversees the process and reviews all the submitted films. Following this, they vote via secret ballot to determine the five nominees for the award. Below is a list of the films that have been submitted by Slovenia for review by the Academy for the award by year and the respective Academy Awards ceremony.

See also
List of Yugoslavian submissions for the Academy Award for Best Foreign Language Film
List of Academy Award winners and nominees for Best Foreign Language Film
List of Slovenian films

Notes

References

External links
The Official Academy Awards Database
The Motion Picture Credits Database
IMDb Academy Awards Page

Slovenia
Academy Award
Academy Award